Hans Martin Gulbrandsen (31 January 1914 – 4 February 1979) was a Norwegian sprint canoeist. He competed at the 1948 Summer Olympics in London where he finished 4th in the K-1 1000 m event, and at the 1952 Summer Olympics in Helsinki, where he finished 5th in K-1 10000 m.

He received a silver medal in K-1 4 x 500 m at the 1948 ICF Canoe Sprint World Championships also held in London.

References

1914 births
1979 deaths
Canoeists at the 1948 Summer Olympics
Canoeists at the 1952 Summer Olympics
Norwegian male canoeists
Olympic canoeists of Norway
ICF Canoe Sprint World Championships medalists in kayak